Konrad Holenstein (born 18 August 1948) is a retired Liechtensteiner football striker and later manager.

References

1948 births
Living people
Liechtenstein footballers
Grasshopper Club Zürich players
TSV 1860 Munich players
FC Fribourg players
FC Lugano players
Club Brugge KV players
FC Balzers players
FC Nordstern Basel players
Association football forwards
Liechtenstein expatriate footballers
Expatriate footballers in Germany
Liechtenstein expatriate sportspeople in Germany
Expatriate footballers in Belgium
Liechtenstein expatriate sportspeople in Belgium
Swiss Super League players
Liechtenstein football managers
FC Schaffhausen managers